Falaisia (before 1918: Μπούρα - Boura) is a village and a former municipality in southwestern Arcadia, Peloponnese, Greece. Since the 2011 local government reform it is part of the municipality Megalopoli, of which it is a municipal unit. The municipal unit has an area of 274.926 km2. The seat of the municipality was in Leontari, 5 km northwest of the village Falaisia. The municipal unit Falaisia is located in the northern foothills of the Taygetus mountains, south of Megalopoli and north of Kalamata. It borders on Laconia to the southeast, and Messenia to the southwest.

Subdivisions
The municipal unit Falaisia is subdivided into the following communities (constituent villages in brackets):
Akovos (Akovos, Goupata)
Anavryto (Anavryto, Kato Anavryto)
Anemodouri
Dyrrachio
Ellinitsa
Falaisia (Falaisia, Moni Boura)
Giannaioi (Ano Giannaioi, Kato Giannaioi)
Graikos
Kamara (Kamara, Kampochori)
Leontari (Leontari, Gavria, Kalyvia, Kamaritsa, Kotsiridi)
Leptini
Neochori Falaisias
Petrina (Petrina, Moni Ampelaki, Spanaiika)
Potamia
Routsi
Skortsinos
Soulari
Tourkolekas
Veligosti
Voutsaras

Historical population

See also
List of settlements in Arcadia

References

External links
Arcadia - Falaisia

 
Populated places in Arcadia, Peloponnese